Enrico Mazzanti (5 April 1850, in Florence – 3 September 1910, in Florence) was an Italian engineer and cartoonist, who illustrated the first edition of Pinocchio.

Footnotes

1850 births
1910 deaths
Engineers from Florence
Italian cartoonists
Italian children's book illustrators
Artists from Florence

sv:Pinocchio#Om berättelsen